The 8th constituency of Budapest is one of the single member constituencies of the National Assembly, the national legislature of Hungary. The constituency standard abbreviation: Budapest 08. OEVK.

Since 2014, it has been represented by Csaba Tóth of the MSZP-Dialogue party alliance.

Geography
The 8th constituency is located in central-northeastern part of Pest.

The constituency borders with 11th- and 12th constituency to the north, 13th constituency to the east, 9th- and 6th constituency to the south, 5th- and 7th constituency to the west.

List of districts
The constituency includes the following municipalities:

 District XIV.: Main part of the district (except Rákosfalva, Alsórákos).

History
The 8th constituency of Budapest was created in 2011 and contained of the pre-2011 abolished constituencies of the 21st and part of 22nd constituency of the capital. Its borders have not changed since its creation.

Members
The constituency was first represented by Csaba Tóth of MSZP (with Unity support) from 2014, and he was re-elected in 2018.

Election result

2022 election

2018 election

2014 election

Notes

References

Budapest 8th